The 2016 Mexico City ePrix was a Formula E motor race held on 12 March 2016 at the Autódromo Hermanos Rodríguez in Mexico City, Mexico. It was the fifth championship race of the 2015–16 Formula E season, the single-seater, electrically powered racing car series' second season. It also was the 16th Formula E race overall. The race was initially won by Lucas di Grassi, but later the win was handed to Jérôme d'Ambrosio because di Grassi's car was found to be underweight. This was d'Ambrosio's second Formula E win, after the 2015 Berlin ePrix, where he had also benefited from a disqualification of di Grassi.

Circuit
The race took place on a modified version of the Autódromo Hermanos Rodríguez circuit. It was the first Formula E race on a permanent road course. The version used for the ePrix leads through the stadium section and also part of the oval. It is 2.092 kilometers in length and features 18 turns. Track design modification was done by Agustin Delicado Zomeño.

Report

Background
The same 18 drivers as in the previous ePrix participated in this race.

Classifications

Qualifying 

Notes:

  – Final grid position of top five qualifiers determined by Super Pole shootout.
  – António Félix da Costa received a ten place penalty for changing the gearbox

Super Pole

Race 

Notes:
 – Three points for pole position.
 – Two points for fastest lap.
 – Loïc Duval received a fifteen second penalty for frequent abuse of track limits.
 – Lucas di Grassi originally finished first, but was disqualified for having an underweight car.

Standings after the race

Drivers' Championship standings

Teams' Championship standings

 Notes: Only the top five positions are included for both sets of standings.

References

|- style="text-align:center"
|width="35%"|Previous race:2016 Buenos Aires ePrix
|width="30%"|FIA Formula E Championship2015–16 season
|width="35%"|Next race:2016 Long Beach ePrix
|- style="text-align:center"
|width="35%"|Previous race:n/a
|width="30%"|Mexico City ePrix
|width="35%"|Next race:2017 Mexico City ePrix
|- style="text-align:center"

Mexico City ePrix
Mexico City ePrix
ePrix
Mexico City ePrix